Synodontinae is a subfamily of lizardfishes in the family Synodontidae.

It comprises two extant genera, and one extinct genus:
Synodus, fossil material known from Miocene-aged strata
Trachinocephalus
Argillichthys, known only from a skull, from the Ypresian of England

References
Taxonomy
Subfamily Synodontinae - Australian Faunal Directory

Synodontidae
Fish subfamilies